Menesia vitiphaga is a species of beetle in the family Cerambycidae. It was described by Holzschuh in 2003. It is known from China.

References

Menesia
Beetles described in 2003